is a vertically scrolling shoot 'em up developed by SKONEC Entertainment and distributed by Success. It is the sequel to the 2000 title, Psyvariar.

The game was initially developed for the Sega NAOMI arcade platform, and was released in Japanese arcades in November 2003. A Dreamcast version was released on February 26, 2004, and ports to both the PlayStation 2 and Xbox were released later that year.

External links
SKONEC page
Success corp page: Arcade, DC/Xbox/PS2, DC, Xbox, PS2

2003 video games
2004 video games
Arcade video games
Dreamcast games
PlayStation 2 games
Vertically scrolling shooters
Video games developed in Japan
Xbox games
Success (company) games

ja:サイヴァリア#サイヴァリア2